Oigon Lake is a lake in Zavkhan, in north-western Mongolia.

Mongolian prime minister and reborn lama Jalkhanz Khutagt Sodnomyn Damdinbazar was born there in 1874.

References

Lakes of Mongolia